Geçitaltı (also known as Goh) is a village in the Kozluk District of Batman Province in Turkey. The village is populated by Arabs and had a population of 807 in 2021.

The hamlets of Çubuk, Gelşe, İkipınar, Mezarlık, Saraycık, Sugesiye and Topak are attached to the village.

References 

Villages in Kozluk District
Arab settlements in Batman Province